Douglas Haig Young (April 13, 1928 – March 14, 2019) was a Canadian politician. He represented the electoral district of Harbour Grace in the Newfoundland and Labrador House of Assembly from 1972 to 1989. He was a member of the Progressive Conservative Party of Newfoundland and Labrador. He was a former Minister of Public Works of Newfoundland and Labrador. Born in Upper Island Cove, he was a funeral director and had two children.

References

1928 births
2019 deaths
Progressive Conservative Party of Newfoundland and Labrador MHAs